ʿAbd al-Rahman al-Sufi (December 7, 903 – May 25, 986) was an iranian astronomer also known as ʿAbd ar-Rahman as-Sufi, ʿAbd al-Rahman Abu al-Husayn, ʿAbdul Rahman Sufi, or ʿAbdurrahman Sufi, historically, in the West as Azophi, Azophi Arabus, and Albuhassin.  Al-Sufi published his famous Book of Fixed Stars (كتاب صور الكواكب) in 964, which included both textual descriptions and pictures. Al-Biruni reports that his work on the ecliptic was carried out in Shiraz. He lived at the Buyid court in Isfahan.

Biography
ʿAbd al-Rahman al-Sufi (his complete name was Abu al-Husayn ʿAbd al-Rahman ibn 'Umar, as-Sufi, al-Razi, al-Bazzaz) was one of the nine famous Muslim astronomers. His name implies that he was a Sufi Muslim. He lived at the court of Emir 'Adud al-Dawla in Isfahan, Persia, and worked on translating and expanding Greek astronomical works, especially the Almagest of Ptolemy. He contributed several corrections to Ptolemy's star list while his brightness and magnitude estimates frequently deviated from those in Ptolemy's work, with only 55% of Al-Sufi's magnitudes being identical to Ptolemy's.

He was a major contributor to the translation into Arabic of the Hellenistic astronomy that had been centered in Alexandria, Egypt.  His was the first to attempt to relate the Greek with the traditional Arabic star names and constellations, which were completely unrelated and overlapped in complicated ways.

Astronomy

Al-Sufi made his astronomical observations at a latitude of 32.7N° in Isfahan. It has been claimed that he identified the Large Magellanic Cloud but this seems to be a misunderstanding of a reference to some stars south of Canopus which he admits he has not seen. He also made the earliest recorded observation of the Andromeda Galaxy in 964, describing it as a "small cloud". This was the first galaxy other than the Milky Way to be mentioned in writing.

Al-Sufi published Kitab al-Kawatib al-Thabit al-Musawwar (also commonly known as the Book of Fixed Stars) in 964 and dedicated it to Adud al-Dawla, the ruler of Buwayhid at the time. This book describes 48 constellations and the stars that are part of those constellations. 

Within the Book of Fixed Stars, Al-Sufi compared Greek and Arabic constellations and stars linking those there were the same in both texts. He included two illustrations of each constellation, one showing the orientation of the stars from the perspective outside the celestial globe and the other from the perspective of looking at the sky while standing on the earth. He separated the constellations into three groups: twenty-one northern constellations, twelve zodiac constellations, and fifteen southern constellations. For each of these forty-eight constellations, Al-Sufi provided a star chart that contains all of the stars that form the constellation. Each star chart comprised names and numbers of the individual stars in the constellation, and provided their longitudinal and latitudinal coordinates, the magnitude or brightness of each star, and its location north or south of the ecliptic. 

Although the magnitude was given for each star, of the 35 remaining copies of the Book of Fixed Stars the star magnitudes are not consistently the same number for each star due to scribing errors. Al-Sufi organized the stars in each of his drawings into two groups: the stars that form the image that the constellation is meant to depict, and the stars that are in close proximity to the constellation but do not contribute to the overall image. He identified and described stars not included by Ptolemy, but he did not include them in his star charts. Al-Sufi states at the beginning of the Book of Fixed Stars that his charts are modeled after those that were produced by Ptolemy, so Al-Sufi left the stars excluded in Ptolemy's charts  out of his charts as well.

Ptolemy had published the Almagest 839 years earlier than Al-Sufi, so the longitudinal placement of the stars within constellations had changed over that time. To account for the procession of the stars, Al-Sufi added 12° 42' to the longitudes Ptolemy had previously suggested for the placement of the stars. Al-Sufi differed in Ptolemy by having a three level scale to measure the magnitude of stars instead of a two level scale. This extra level increased the accuracy of his measurements. His methodology for determining these magnitude measurements cannot be found in any of his remaining texts.

Despite the importance of the Book of Fixed Stars in the history of astronomy, it took more than a thousand years until the first English translation was published in 2010.

Al-Sufi observed that the ecliptic plane is inclined with respect to the celestial equator and quite accurately calculated the length of the tropical year.

Al-Sufi also wrote about the astrolabe, finding numerous additional uses for it: he described over 1000 different uses, in areas as diverse as astronomy, astrology, horoscopes, navigation, surveying, timekeeping, Qibla and Salat prayer.

Al-Sufi's astronomical work was subsequently used by many other astronomers, including Ulugh Beg who was both a prince and astronomer.

Legacy
The lunar crater Azophi and the minor planet 12621 Alsufi are named after him. 

Astronomy Society of Iran – Amateur Committee (ASIAC) has held an international Sufi Observing Competition in memory of Al-Sufi. The first competition was held in 2006 in the north of Semnan Province and the second was held in the summer of 2008 in Ladiz near the Zahedan. More than 100 attendees from Iran and Iraq participated in the events.

On December 7, 2016, Google Doodle commemorated his 1113th birthday.

Gallery

See also
 Brocchi's Cluster
 Astronomy in the medieval Islamic world
 List of pre-modern Iranian scientists and scholars
 List of scientists in medieval Islamic world

Citations

General sources 
 "Abd al-Rahman Al-Sufi's (Azophi) 1113th Birthday". Google.com. December 7, 2016. 
 Al-Qifti. Ikhbar al-'ulama' bi-akhbar al-hukama (History of Learned Men). In: Άbdul-Ramān al-Şūfī and his Book of the Fixed Stars: A Journey of Re-discovery by Ihsan Hafez, Richard F. Stephenson, Wayne Orchiston (2011). In: Orchiston, Wayne, Highlighting the history of astronomy in the Asia-Pacific region: proceedings of the ICOA-6 conference. Astrophysics and Space Science Proceedings. New York: Springer. . "... is the honored, the perfect, the most intelligent and the friend of the King Adud al-Dawla Fanakhasru Shahenshah Ibn Buwaih. He is the author of the most honored books in the science of astronomy. He was originally from Nisa and is of a Persian descent."
 "Archived copy". Archived from the original on 2009-10-20. Retrieved 2009-01-07.
 Cavin, Jerry D. (2012). The amateur Astronomer's Guide to the Deep-Sky Catalogs. Springer Science+Business Media, LLC. . OCLC 759795491.
 Dr. Emily Winterburn (National Maritime Museum) (2005). "Using an Astrolabe". Foundation for Science Technology and Civilisation. Retrieved 2008-01-22.
 Hafez, Ihsan; Stephenson, Richard; Orchiston, Wayne, (2011-01-01), Abdul-Rahman al-Sufi and his Book of the Fixed Stars, pp. 121–138, retrieved 2019-11-13.
 Kepple, George Robert; Glen W. Sanner (1998). The Night Sky Observer's Guide. 1. Willmann-Bell. p. 18. .
 Knobel, E. B. (June 1885). "On Al Sufi's star magnitudes". Monthly Notices of the Royal Astronomical Society. 45: 417–425.
 "Observatoire de Paris (Abd-al-Rahman Al Sufi)". Archived from the original on April 16, 2007. Retrieved 2007-04-19.
 "Observatoire de Paris (LMC)". Archived from the original on April 17, 2007. Retrieved 2007-04-19.
 Orchiston, Wayne; Green, David A.; Strom, Richard (2014-11-24). New Insights From Recent Studies in Historical Astronomy: Following in the Footsteps of F. Richard Stephenson: A Meeting to Honor F. Richard Stephenson on His 70th Birthday. Springer. .
 Robert Harry van Gent. Biography of al-Sūfī. "The Persian astronomer Abū al-Husayn ‘Abd al-Rahmān ibn ‘Umar al-Sūfī was born in Rayy (near Tehrān) on 7 December 903 [14 Muharram 291 H] and died in Baghdād on 25 May 986 [13 Muharram 376 H] ... the Persian astronomer Abū al-Husayn ‘Abd al-Rahmān ibn ‘Umar al-Sūfī who was commonly known by European astronomers as Azophi Arabus". University of Utrecht, Netherlands. Retrieved 2014-01-11.
 Schaefer, Bradley E. (2013-02). "The Thousand Star Magnitudes in the Catalogues of Ptolemy, Al Sufi, and Tycho are All Corrected for Atmospheric Extinction". Journal for the History of Astronomy. 44 (1): 47-A91. . . 
 Selin, Helaine (2008). Encyclopedia of the history of science, technology, and medicine in non-western cultures. Berlin; New York: Springer. p. 160. . Al-Sūfī was an astronomer in the Arabic-Islamic area. He was of Persian origin, but wrote in Arabic, the language of all science in that time.
 Upton, Joseph M. (March 1933). "A Manuscript of 'The Book of the Fixed Stars' by ʿAbd Ar-Rahmān As-Sūfī". Metropolitan Museum Studies. 4: 179–197. . .

External links 
  Liber locis stellarum fixarum, 964 da www.atlascoelestis.com
   Liber locis stellarum fixarum, 964, manoscritto del 1417 riprodotto il 1730  da www.atlascoelestis.com
 Ulug Beg in www.atlascoelestis.com
 Al-Sufi's constellations
 Al-Sūfī’s Book of the Constellations of the Fixed Stars and its Influence on Islamic and Western Celestial Cartography

10th-century Iranian astronomers
Astronomers of the medieval Islamic world
903 births
986 deaths
Scholars under the Buyid dynasty
Greek–Arabic translators
People from Ray, Iran